El Salvador is divided into 14 departments (Spanish: departamentos) for administrative purposes, subdivided into 262 municipalities (municipios). The country is a unitary state.

Departments

See also
El Salvador
List of cities in El Salvador
Municipalities of El Salvador
Geography of El Salvador
Ranked list of Salvadoran departments
List of Salvadoran departmental capitals
Salvadoran Departments by HDI
Department (country subdivision)
Municipality
ISO 3166-2:SV

References 

 
Subdivisions of El Salvador
Lists of subdivisions of El Salvador
Departments, El Salvador